The 2011 Kwara State gubernatorial election was the 7th gubernatorial election of Kwara State. Held on April 26, 2011, the People's Democratic Party nominee Abdulfatah Ahmed won the election, defeating Dele Belgore of the Action Congress of Nigeria.

Results 
A total of 15 candidates contested in the election. Abdulfatah Ahmed from the People's Democratic Party won the election, defeating Dele Belgore from the Action Congress of Nigeria. Valid votes was 504,102.

References 

Kwara State gubernatorial elections
Kwara gubernatorial
April 2011 events in Nigeria